The 2004 Fórmula Truck season was the 9th Fórmula Truck season. It began on March 14 at Caruaru and ended on December 5 at Brasília.

Calendar and results
All races were held in Brazil.

References

External links
  

2004 in Brazilian motorsport
2004